TDAP may refer to:

 Tdap and TDaP, DPT vaccines
Trade Development Authority (Pakistan)
Taught degree awarding powers, granted by the Privy Council of the United Kingdom